Tony Grant is the name of:

 Tony Grant (Irish footballer) (born 1976)
 Tony Grant (English footballer) (born 1974)
 Tony Grant (singer) (born 1967), American singer and stage actor
 Toni Grant (1942–2016), American psychologist and radio talk show host

See also
 Anthony Grant (disambiguation)